Maheshwar Singh (born 1 January 1946) is an Indian former cricketer. He played first-class cricket for Andhra and Hyderabad between 1969 and 1978.

See also
 List of Hyderabad cricketers

References

External links
 

1946 births
Living people
Indian cricketers
Andhra cricketers
Hyderabad cricketers
Cricketers from Hyderabad, India